Mancebo is a surname of Spanish origin. Notable people with the surname include:

Eleuterio Mancebo (born 1968), Spanish cyclist
Francisco Mancebo (born 1976), Spanish cyclist

References

Surnames of Spanish origin